The 2022 Bosnia and Herzegovina Football Cup final was an association football match played at Bilino Polje Stadium in Zenica, Bosnia and Herzegovina, on 19 May 2022. Sarajevo and Velež Mostar were the finalists.

Velež won the trophy for the first time in the club's history. As winners, Velež qualified for the 2022–23 UEFA Europa Conference League.

Route to the final

Match

Details

Match rules
90 minutes
Penalty shoot-out if scores level
Nine named substitutes
Maximum of five substitutions

References

External links
Official website 

Bosnia and Herzegovina Football Cup Finals
2021–22 in Bosnia and Herzegovina football
Bosnia and Herzegovina Football Cup final 2022